Vigna trilobata, the African gram, three-lobe-leaf cowpea or jungle mat bean, is a regenerating annual (though occasionally perennial) herb found in India, Pakistan, Sri Lanka, Burma, Afghanistan and the Malay archipelago.

Description
Vigna trilobata is an annual or perennial legume. The leaves are also glabrous to sub-glabrous and usually shiny.

Habitat and ecology
Vigna trilobata is mostly found on well-drained, alkaline, dark, cracking clay soils, but also on sandy and loamy soils of similar reaction and can rarely be found on poorly drained soils. One of its major features is its strong resistance to drought, though the seeds shatter in frost. It is also moderately tolerant of salinity. Under well-watered conditions, flowering and seed set is continuous but sparse. However, under moisture stress, plants respond with more dense flowering, far greater seed production and a reduction in vegetative growth. It is tolerant of regular or constant heavy grazing, but not of infrequent heavy grazing when a bulk of foliage is rapidly removed.

Uses
Vigna trilobata is cultivated in India, Pakistan, and Sudan for short-term pasturage. It is valued highly as it is very tolerant of grazing and is very palatable, even being a human food alternative. However, it tends to have a very low yield.

References

trilobata